Aernouts or Aernoutsz is a surname. Notable people with the surname include:

Jim Aernouts (born 1989), Belgian cyclist
Bart Aernouts (born 1982), Belgian cyclist
Jurriaen Aernoutsz, Dutch navy captain

See also
Aernout